Jonah Deocampo, better known by his stage name Bambu, is a Filipino-American community activist and rapper from Los Angeles, California. He has been called "one of the most well-respected indie musicians in the US".

The son of a Filipino emigrant mother, Bambu was raised in a working-class Los Angeles neighborhood which was characterized by a "wartime mentality." At the age of 15, he became involved with street gangs. At 16, he was arrested for armed robbery and spent time in Los Angeles' Central Juvenile Hall. Released at 18, Bambu was advised by a judge to join the United States Marine Corps, which he did. He served as a special operations training group instructor (SARC) and spent time in East Timor, the Middle East, and Okinawa, Japan.

Bambu's Exrcising a Demon is a 5-part series that weaves voices from Filipino-American gang members as a means of documenting early 1980s and 1990s Los Angeles. Article I: A Few Left was released in September 2018, and Article II: Brother Hoods was released in June 2019.

Bambu's music deals with themes of police brutality, racial prejudice and economic inequality. His music often alludes to leftist figures, including Karl Marx, Vladimir Lenin, and Mao Zedong. For example, his 2007 album ...i scream bars for the children... features a song entitled "Chairman Mao."

Bambu was the Secretary General of Kabataang Makabayan USA (KM, also known as Patriotic Youth) in Los Angeles.

He is a resident of Oakland, California.

He also has a deal with FlipTop Battle League, showing in their live events, recently at the FlipTop Festival.

During the height of the 2020 COVID-19 pandemic, Bambu released a 7-song album "Sharpest Tool In The Shed." The album finds Bambu continuing his staunch critique of the status quo, as well as giving words of support to his listeners as they work through the pandemic.

Discography
 self untitled... (2002), self-released
 .38 Revolver Mixtape (2005), self-released 
 ...i scream bars for the children... (2007), self-released 
 ...exact change... (2009), Beatrock Music
 ...A Peaceful Riot... - Fatgums X Bambu (2009), Beatrock Music 
 ...paper cuts... (2010), Beatrock Music
 Los Angeles, Philippines - DJ Muggs & Bambu (2010), Soul Assassins Records
 ...spare change... (2011), Beatrock Music
 Prometheus Brown and Bambu Walk into a Bar - The Bar (2011), Beatrock Music x In4mation 
 Diamond Supply Co. Presents: Bambu FreEP (2011), Diamond Supply Co. 
 ...one rifle per family. (2012), Beatrock Music 
 The Lean Sessions EP (2013), Beatrock Music 
 Sun of a Gun Mixtape (2013), Beatrock Music 
 Barkada EP - The Bar (2014), Beatrock Music 
 5AM in Manila EP (2014), Beatrock Music x Uprising Records 
 Party Worker (2014), Beatrock Music x Bambu De Pistola 
 Son of Barkada - The Bar (2015), Beatrock Music 
 The Comrades Sessions EP (2015),  Beatrock Music 
 Prey for the Devil (2016), Beatrock Music
 Exrcising a Demon - Article I - A Few Left (2018), Beatrock Music
 Exrcising a Demon - Article II - Brother Hoods (2019), Beatrock Music
 Sharpest Tool In The Shed (2020), Beatrock Music
 Unreleased: October 2019 By OJ the Producer (2021), Beatrock Music

References

External links
 Bambu Beatrock Records

Year of birth missing (living people)
Living people
American male rappers
American rappers of Filipino descent
American rappers of Asian descent
California socialists
Rappers from Los Angeles
Rappers from Oakland, California
United States Marines
Underground rappers
21st-century American rappers
21st-century American male musicians
Activists from Oakland, California
Activists from Los Angeles
American Maoists